School of Electrotechnics Zagreb is a school specialised for electro-technicians, computer technicians and technicians for electro-engineering. It was founded in 1959 as Center for educating "Rade Končar". In 1991 the school changed its name to School of Electrotechnics which is still its name. Director of school is Ivo Klarić and his assistant is Stjepan Novoselac.

External links
Electrotehnic school site

Schools in Croatia
Education in Zagreb
Educational institutions established in 1959
Buildings and structures in Zagreb
1959 establishments in Yugoslavia